

Events

Pre-1600
 684 – Battle of Marj Rahit: Umayyad partisans defeat the supporters of Ibn al-Zubayr and cement Umayyad control of Syria.
707 – Princess Abe accedes to the imperial Japanese throne as Empress Genmei.
1304 – The Battle of Mons-en-Pévèle is fought to a draw between the French army and the Flemish militias.
1487 – The Siege of Málaga ends with the taking of the city by Castilian and Aragonese forces.
1492 – The first grammar of the Spanish language (Gramática de la lengua castellana) is presented to Queen Isabella I.
1572 – The Huguenot King Henry III of Navarre marries the Catholic Margaret of Valois, ostensibly to reconcile the feuding Protestants and Catholics of France.
1590 – John White, the governor of the Roanoke Colony, returns from a supply trip to England and finds his settlement deserted.

1601–1900
1612 – The trial of the Pendle witches, one of England's most famous witch trials, begins at Lancaster Assizes.
1634 – Urbain Grandier, accused and convicted of sorcery, is burned alive in Loudun, France.
1721 – The city of Shamakhi in Safavid Shirvan is sacked.
1783 – A huge fireball meteor is seen across Great Britain as it passes over the east coast.
1809 – The Senate of Finland is established in the Grand Duchy of Finland after the official adoption of the Statute of the Government Council by Tsar Alexander I of Russia.
1826 – Major Gordon Laing becomes the first European to enter Timbuktu.
1838 – The Wilkes Expedition, which would explore the Puget Sound and Antarctica, weighs anchor at Hampton Roads.
1848 – Camila O'Gorman and Ladislao Gutierrez are executed on the orders of Argentine dictator Juan Manuel de Rosas.
1864 – American Civil War: Battle of Globe Tavern: Union forces try to cut a vital Confederate supply-line into Petersburg, Virginia, by attacking the Wilmington and Weldon Railroad.
1868 – French astronomer Pierre Janssen discovers helium.
1870 – Franco-Prussian War: Battle of Gravelotte is fought.
1877 – American astronomer Asaph Hall discovers Phobos, one of Mars’s moons.
1891 – A major hurricane strikes Martinique, leaving 700 dead.

1901–present
1903 – German engineer Karl Jatho allegedly flies his self-made, motored gliding airplane four months before the first flight of the Wright brothers.
1917 – A Great Fire in Thessaloniki, Greece, destroys 32% of the city leaving 70,000 individuals homeless.
1920 – The Nineteenth Amendment to the United States Constitution is ratified, guaranteeing women's suffrage.
1923 – The first British Track and Field championships for women are held in London, Great Britain.
1933 – The Volksempfänger is first presented to the German public at a radio exhibition; the presiding Nazi Minister of Propaganda, Joseph Goebbels, delivers an accompanying speech heralding the radio as the ‘eighth great power’.
1937 – A lightning strike starts the Blackwater Fire of 1937 in Shoshone National Forest, killing 15 firefighters within 3 days and prompting the United States Forest Service to develop their smokejumper program.
1938 – The Thousand Islands Bridge, connecting New York, United States, with Ontario, Canada, over the Saint Lawrence River, is dedicated by U.S. President Franklin D. Roosevelt.
1940 – World War II: The Hardest Day air battle, part of the Battle of Britain, takes place. At that point, it is the largest aerial engagement in history with heavy losses sustained on both sides.
1945 – Sukarno takes office as the first president of Indonesia, following the country's declaration of independence the previous day.
  1945   – Soviet-Japanese War: Battle of Shumshu: Soviet forces land at Takeda Beach on Shumshu Island and launch the Battle of Shumshu; the Soviet Union’s Invasion of the Kuril Islands commences.
1950 – Julien Lahaut, the chairman of the Communist Party of Belgium, is assassinated. The Party newspaper blames royalists and Rexists.
1958 – Vladimir Nabokov's controversial novel Lolita is published in the United States.
  1958   – Brojen Das from Bangladesh swims across the English Channel in a competition as the first Bengali and the first Asian to do so, placing first among the 39 competitors.
1963 – Civil rights movement: James Meredith becomes the first African American to graduate from the University of Mississippi.
1965 – Vietnam War: Operation Starlite begins: United States Marines destroy a Viet Cong stronghold on the Van Tuong peninsula in the first major American ground battle of the war.
1966 – Vietnam War: The Battle of Long Tan ensues after a patrol from the 6th Battalion, Royal Australian Regiment clashes with a Viet Cong force in Phước Tuy Province.
1971 – Vietnam War: Australia and New Zealand decide to withdraw their troops from Vietnam.
1976 – The Korean axe murder incident in Panmunjom results in the deaths of two US Army officers.
  1976   – The Soviet Union’s robotic probe Luna 24 successfully lands on the Moon.
1977 – Steve Biko is arrested at a police roadblock under Terrorism Act No. 83 of 1967 in King William's Town, South Africa. He later dies from injuries sustained during this arrest, bringing attention to South Africa's apartheid policies.
1983 – Hurricane Alicia hits the Texas coast, killing 21 people and causing over US$1 billion in damage (1983 dollars).
1989 – Leading presidential hopeful Luis Carlos Galán is assassinated near Bogotá in Colombia.
1993 – American International Airways Flight 808 crashes at Leeward Point Field at Guantanamo Bay Naval Base in Guantánamo Bay, Cuba, injuring the three crew members.
2003 – One-year-old Zachary Turner is murdered in Newfoundland by his mother, who was awarded custody despite facing trial for the murder of Zachary's father. The case was documented in the film Dear Zachary and led to reform of Canada's bail laws.
2005 – A massive power blackout hits the Indonesian island of Java; affecting almost 100 million people, it is one of the largest and most widespread power outages in history.
2008 – The President of Pakistan, Pervez Musharra, resigns under threat of impeachment.
  2008   – War of Afghanistan: The Uzbin Valley ambush occurs.
2017 – The first terrorist attack ever sentenced as a crime in Finland kills two and injures eight.
2019 – One hundred activists, officials, and other concerned citizens in Iceland hold a funeral for Okjökull glacier, which has completely melted after having once covered six square miles (15.5 km2).

Births

Pre-1600
1305 – Ashikaga Takauji, Japanese Shōgun (d. 1358)
1450 – Marko Marulić, Croatian poet and author (d. 1524)
1458 – Lorenzo Pucci, Catholic cardinal (d. 1531)
1497 – Francesco Canova da Milano, Italian composer (d. 1543)
1542 – Charles Neville, 6th Earl of Westmorland (d. 1601)
1579 – Countess Charlotte Flandrina of Nassau (d. 1640)
1587 – Virginia Dare, granddaughter of Governor John White of the Colony of Roanoke, first child born to English parents in the Americas (date of death unknown)
1596 – Jean Bolland, Flemish priest and hagiographer (d. 1665)

1601–1900
1605 – Henry Hammond, English churchman and theologian (d. 1660)
1606 – Maria Anna of Spain (d. 1646)
1629 – Agneta Horn, Swedish writer (d. 1672)
1657 – Ferdinando Galli-Bibiena, Italian architect and painter (d. 1743)
1685 – Brook Taylor, English mathematician and theorist (d. 1731)
1692 – Louis Henri, Duke of Bourbon (d. 1740)
1700 – Baji Rao I, first Peshwa of Maratha Empire (d. 1740)
1720 – Laurence Shirley, 4th Earl Ferrers, English politician (d. 1760)
1750 – Antonio Salieri, Italian composer and conductor (d. 1825)
1754 – François, marquis de Chasseloup-Laubat, French general and engineer (d. 1833)
1774 – Meriwether Lewis, American soldier, explorer, and politician (d. 1809)
1792 – John Russell, 1st Earl Russell, English politician, Prime Minister of the United Kingdom (d. 1878)
1803 – Nathan Clifford, American lawyer, jurist, and politician, 19th United States Attorney General (d. 1881)
1807 – B. T. Finniss, Australian politician, 1st Premier of South Australia (d. 1893)
1819 – Grand Duchess Maria Nikolaevna of Russia (d. 1876)
1822 – Isaac P. Rodman, American general and politician (d. 1862)
1830 – Franz Joseph I of Austria (d. 1916)
1831 – Ernest Noel, Scottish businessman and politician (d. 1931)
1834 – Marshall Field, American businessman, founded Marshall Field's (d. 1906)
1841 – William Halford, English-American lieutenant, Medal of Honor recipient (d. 1919)
1855 – Alfred Wallis, English painter and illustrator (d. 1942)
1857 – Libert H. Boeynaems, Belgian-American bishop and missionary (d. 1926)
1866 – Mahboob Ali Khan, 6th Nizam of Hyderabad (d. 1911)
1869 – Carl Rungius, German-American painter and educator (d. 1959)
1870 – Lavr Kornilov, Russian general and explorer (d. 1918)
1879 – Alexander Rodzyanko, Russian general (d. 1970)
1885 – Nettie Palmer, Australian poet and critic (d. 1964)
1887 – John Anthony Sydney Ritson, English rugby player, mines inspector, engineer and professor of mining (d. 1957)
1890 – Walther Funk, German economist and politician, Reich Minister of Economics (d. 1960)
1893 – Burleigh Grimes, American baseball player and manager (d. 1985)
  1893   – Ernest MacMillan, Canadian conductor and composer (d. 1973)
1896 – Jack Pickford, Canadian-American actor and director (d. 1933)
1898 – Clemente Biondetti, Italian race car driver (d. 1955)
1900 – Ruth Bonner, Soviet Communist activist, sentenced to a labor camp during Joseph Stalin's Great Purge (d. 1987)
  1900   – Ruth Norman, American religious leader (d. 1993)

1901–present
1902 – Adamson-Eric, Estonian painter (d. 1968)
  1902   – Margaret Murie, American environmentalist and author (d. 2003)
1903 – Lucienne Boyer, French singer (d. 1983)
1904 – Max Factor, Jr., American businessman (d. 1996)
1905 – Enoch Light, American bandleader, violinist, and recording engineer (d. 1978)
1906 – Marcel Carné, French director and screenwriter (d. 1996)
  1906   – Curtis Jones, American blues pianist and singer (d. 1971)
1908 – Edgar Faure, French historian and politician, 139th Prime Minister of France (d. 1988)
  1908   – Olav H. Hauge, Norwegian poet and gardener (d. 1994)
  1908   – Bill Merritt, New Zealand cricketer and sportscaster (d. 1977)
1909 – Gérard Filion, Canadian businessman and journalist (d. 2005)
1910 – Herman Berlinski, Polish-American pianist, composer, and conductor (d. 2001)
  1910   – Robert Winters, Canadian colonel, engineer, and politician, 26th Canadian Minister of Public Works (d. 1969)
1911 – Amelia Boynton Robinson, American activist (d. 2015)
  1911   – Klara Dan von Neumann, Hungarian computer scientist and programmer (d. 1963)
1912 – Otto Ernst Remer, German general (d. 1997)
1913 – Romain Maes, Belgian cyclist (d. 1983)
1914 – Lucy Ozarin, United States Navy lieutenant commander and psychiatrist (d. 2017)
1915 – Max Lanier, American baseball player and manager (d. 2007)
1916 – Neagu Djuvara, Romanian historian, journalist, and diplomat (d. 2018)
  1916   – Moura Lympany, English pianist (d. 2005)
1917 – Caspar Weinberger, American captain, lawyer, and politician, 15th United States Secretary of Defense (d. 2006)
1918 – Cisco Houston, American singer-songwriter and guitarist (d. 1961)
1919 – Wally Hickel, American businessman and politician, 2nd Governor of Alaska (d. 2010)
1920 – Godfrey Evans, English cricketer (d. 1999)
  1920   – Bob Kennedy, American baseball player and manager (d. 2005)
  1920   – Shelley Winters, American actress (d. 2006)
1921 – Lydia Litvyak, Russian lieutenant and pilot (d. 1943)
  1921   – Zdzisław Żygulski, Polish historian and academic (d. 2015)
1922 – Alain Robbe-Grillet, French director, screenwriter, and novelist (d. 2008)
1923 – Katherine Victor, American actress (d. 2004)
1925 – Brian Aldiss, English author and critic (d. 2017)
  1925   – Pierre Grondin, Canadian surgeon and academic (d. 2006)
  1925   – Anis Mansour, Egyptian journalist and author (d. 2011)
1927 – Rosalynn Carter, 41st First Lady of the United States
1928 – Marge Schott, American businesswoman (d. 2004)
  1928   – Sonny Til, American R&B singer (d. 1981)
1929 – Hugues Aufray, French singer-songwriter
1930 – Liviu Librescu, Romanian-American engineer and academic (d. 2007)
  1930   – Rafael Pineda Ponce, Honduran academic and politician (d. 2014)
1931 – Bramwell Tillsley, Canadian 14th General of The Salvation Army (d. 2019)
  1931   – Hans van Mierlo, Dutch journalist and politician, Deputy Prime Minister of the Netherlands (d. 2010)
  1931   – Grant Williams, American film, theater and television actor (d. 1985)
1932 – Luc Montagnier, French virologist and academic, Nobel Prize laureate (d. 2022)
1933 – Just Fontaine, Moroccan-French footballer and manager (d. 2023)
  1933   – Roman Polanski, French-Polish director, producer, screenwriter, and actor
  1933   – Frank Salemme, American gangster and hitman (d. 2022)
1934 – Vincent Bugliosi, American lawyer and author (d. 2015)
  1934   – Roberto Clemente, Puerto Rican-American baseball player and soldier (d. 1972)
  1934   – Gulzar, Indian poet, lyricist and film director
  1934   – Michael May, German-Swiss race car driver and engineer
1935 – Gail Fisher, American actress (d. 2000)
  1935   – Hifikepunye Pohamba, Namibian lawyer and politician, 2nd President of Namibia
1936 – Robert Redford, American actor, director, and producer
1937 – Sheila Cassidy, English physician and author
1939 – Maxine Brown, American soul/R&B singer-songwriter 
  1939   – Robert Horton, English businessman (d. 2011)
  1939   – Johnny Preston, American pop singer (d. 2011)
1940 – Adam Makowicz, Polish-Canadian pianist and composer
  1940   – Gil Whitney, American journalist (d. 1982)
1943 – Martin Mull, American actor and comedian
  1943   – Gianni Rivera, Italian footballer and politician
  1943   – Carl Wayne, English singer and actor (d. 2004)
1944 – Paula Danziger, American author (d. 2004)
  1944   – Robert Hitchcock, Australian sculptor and illustrator
1945 – Sarah Dash, American singer-songwriter and actress (d. 2021)
  1945   – Värner Lootsmann, Estonian lawyer and politician
  1945   – Lewis Burwell Puller, Jr., American soldier, lawyer, and author (d. 1994)
1948 – James Jones, English bishop
  1948   – John Scarlett, English intelligence officer
1949 – Nigel Griggs, English bass player, songwriter, and producer 
1950 – Dennis Elliott, English drummer and sculptor 
1952 – Elayne Boosler, American actress, director, and screenwriter
  1952   – Patrick Swayze, American actor and dancer (d. 2009)
  1952   – Ricardo Villa, Argentinian footballer and coach
1953 – Louie Gohmert, American captain, lawyer, and politician
  1953   – Marvin Isley, American R&B bass player and songwriter (d. 2010)
1954 – Umberto Guidoni, Italian astrophysicist, astronaut, and politician
1955 – Bruce Benedict, American baseball player and coach
  1955   – Taher Elgamal, Egyptian-American cryptographer
1956 – John Debney, American composer and conductor
  1956   – Sandeep Patil, Indian cricketer and coach
  1956   – Jon Schwartz, American drummer and producer
  1956   – Kelly Willard, American singer-songwriter
  1956   – Rainer Woelki, German cardinal
1957 – Tan Dun, Chinese composer
  1957   – Denis Leary, American comedian, actor, producer, and screenwriter
  1957   – Ron Strykert, Australian singer-songwriter, guitarist, and producer 
1958 – Didier Auriol, French race car driver
  1958   – Madeleine Stowe, American actress
1959 – Tom Prichard, American wrestler and trainer
1960 – Mike LaValliere, American baseball player 
  1960   – Fat Lever, American basketball player and sportscaster
1961 – Huw Edwards, Welsh-English journalist and author
  1961   – Timothy Geithner, American banker and politician, 75th United States Secretary of the Treasury
  1961   – Bob Woodruff, American journalist and author
1962 – Felipe Calderón, Mexican lawyer and politician, 56th President of Mexico
  1962   – Geoff Courtnall, Canadian ice hockey player and coach
  1964 – Craig Bierko, American actor and singer
1964   – Andi Deris, German singer and songwriter
  1964   – Mark Sargent, Australian rugby league player
  1964   – Kenny Walker, American basketball player and sportscaster
1965 – Ikue Ōtani, Japanese voice actress
1966 – Gustavo Charif, Argentinian director and producer
1967 – Daler Mehndi, Indian Punjabi singer, songwriter and record producer 
  1967   – Brian Michael Bendis, American author and illustrator
1969 – Mark Kuhlmann, German rugby player and coach
  1969   – Edward Norton, American actor
1970 – Jason Furman, American economist and politician
  1970   – Malcolm-Jamal Warner, American actor and producer
1971 – Patrik Andersson, Swedish footballer
  1971   – Richard David James, English musician composer
1974 – Nicole Krauss, American novelist and critic
1977 – Paraskevas Antzas, Greek footballer
  1977   – Even Kruse Skatrud, Norwegian musician and educator
1978 – Andy Samberg, American actor and comedian
1979 – Stuart Dew, Australian footballer
1980 – Esteban Cambiasso, Argentinian footballer
  1980   – Rob Nguyen, Australian race car driver
  1980   – Ryan O'Hara, Australian rugby league player
  1980   – Bart Scott, American football player
  1980   – Jeremy Shockey, American football player
1981 – César Delgado, Argentinian footballer
  1981   – Dimitris Salpingidis, Greek footballer
1983 – Mika, Lebanese-born English recording artist and singer-songwriter 
  1983   – Cameron White, Australian cricketer
1984 – Sigourney Bandjar, Dutch footballer
  1984   – Robert Huth, German footballer
1985 – Inge Dekker, Dutch swimmer
  1985   – Bryan Ruiz, Costa Rican footballer
1986 – Evan Gattis, American baseball player
  1986   – Ross McCormack, Scottish footballer
1987 – Joanna Jędrzejczyk, Polish mixed martial artist
1988 – Jack Hobbs, English footballer
  1988   – Eggert Jónsson, Icelandic footballer
  1988   – G-Dragon, South Korean rapper, singer-songwriter and record producer
1989 – Yu Mengyu, Singaporean table tennis player
1992 – Elizabeth Beisel, American swimmer
  1992   – Bogdan Bogdanović, Serbian basketball player
  1992   – Frances Bean Cobain, American visual artist and model 
1993 – Jung Eun-ji, South Korean singer-songwriter
  1993   – Maia Mitchell, Australian actress and singer
  1994 – Madelaine Petsch, American actress and YouTuber
1994   – Morgan Sanson, French footballer
1995 – Alīna Fjodorova, Latvian figure skater
1997 – Renato Sanches, Portuguese footballer
1998 – Brian To'o, Australian-Samoan rugby league player
1999 – Cassius Stanley, American basketball player

Deaths

Pre-1600
 353 – Decentius, Roman usurper
 440 – Pope Sixtus III
 472 – Ricimer, Roman general and politician (b. 405)
 670 – Fiacre, Irish hermit 
 673 – Kim Yu-shin, general of Silla (b. 595)
 849 – Walafrid Strabo, German monk and theologian (b. 808)
911 – Al-Hadi ila'l-Haqq Yahya, first Zaydi Imam of Yemen (b. 859)
1095 – King Olaf I of Denmark
1211 – Narapatisithu, king of Burma (b. 1150)
1258 – Theodore II Laskaris, emperor of Nicea (Byzantine emperor in exile)
1276 – Pope Adrian V (b. 1220)
1318 – Clare of Montefalco, Italian nun and saint (b. 1268)
1430 – Thomas de Ros, 8th Baron de Ros, English soldier and politician (b. 1406)
1500 – Alfonso of Aragon, Spanish prince (b. 1481)
1502 – Knut Alvsson, Norwegian nobleman and politician (b. 1455)
1503 – Pope Alexander VI (b. 1431)
1550 – Antonio Ferramolino, Italian architect and military engineer
1559 – Pope Paul IV (b. 1476)
1563 – Étienne de La Boétie, French judge and philosopher (b. 1530)
1600 – Sebastiano Montelupi, Italian businessman (b. 1516)

1601–1900
1613 – Giovanni Artusi, Italian composer and theorist (b. 1540)
1620 – Wanli Emperor of China (b. 1563)
1625 – Edward la Zouche, 11th Baron Zouche, English diplomat (b. 1556)
1634 – Urbain Grandier, French priest (b. 1590)
1642 – Guido Reni, Italian painter and educator (b. 1575)
1648 – Ibrahim of the Ottoman Empire (b. 1615)
1683 – Charles Hart, English actor (b. 1625)
1707 – William Cavendish, 1st Duke of Devonshire, English soldier and politician, Lord Lieutenant of Derbyshire (b. 1640)
1712 – Richard Savage, 4th Earl Rivers, English general and politician, Lord Lieutenant of Essex (b. 1660)
1765 – Francis I, Holy Roman Emperor (b. 1708)
1815 – Chauncey Goodrich, American lawyer and politician, 8th Lieutenant Governor of Connecticut (b. 1759) 
1823 – André-Jacques Garnerin, French balloonist and the inventor of the frameless parachute (b. 1769)
1842 – Louis de Freycinet, French explorer and navigator (b. 1779)
1850 – Honoré de Balzac, French novelist and playwright  (b. 1799)
1852 – James Finlayson, Scottish Quaker (b. 1772)
1886 – Eli Whitney Blake, American inventor, invented the Mortise lock (b. 1795)

1901–present
1919 – Joseph E. Seagram, Canadian businessman and politician, founded the Seagram Company (b. 1841)
1940 – Walter Chrysler, American businessman, founded Chrysler (b. 1875)
1943 – Ali-Agha Shikhlinski, Azerbaijani general (b. 1865)
1944 – Ernst Thälmann, German soldier and politician (b. 1886)
1945 – Subhas Chandra Bose, Indian activist and politician (b. 1897)
1949 – Paul Mares, American trumpet player and bandleader (b. 1900)
1950 – Julien Lahaut, Belgian soldier and politician (b. 1884)
1952 – Alberto Hurtado, Chilean priest, lawyer, and saint (b. 1901)
1964 – Hildegard Trabant, Berlin Wall victim  (b. 1927)
1968 – Arthur Marshall, American pianist and composer (b. 1881)
1979 – Vasantrao Naik, Indian politician (b. 1913)
1981 – Anita Loos, American author and screenwriter (b. 1889)
1983 – Nikolaus Pevsner, German-English historian and scholar (b. 1902)
1986 – Harun Babunagari, Bangladeshi Islamic scholar and educationist (b. 1902)
1990 – B. F. Skinner, American psychologist and philosopher, invented the Skinner box (b. 1904)
1994 – Francis Raymond Shea, American bishop (b. 1913)
1998 – Persis Khambatta, Indian model and actress, Femina Miss India 1965 (b. 1948)
2001 – David Peakall, English chemist and toxicologist (b. 1931)
2002 – Dean Riesner, American actor and screenwriter (b. 1918)
2003 – Tony Jackson, English singer and bassist (b. 1938)
2004 – Elmer Bernstein, American composer and conductor (b. 1922)
  2004   – Hiram Fong, American soldier and politician (b. 1906)
2005 – Chri$ Ca$h, American wrestler (b. 1982)
2006 – Ken Kearney, Australian rugby player (b. 1924)
2007 – Michael Deaver, American soldier and politician, White House Deputy Chief of Staff (b. 1938)
  2007   – Magdalen Nabb, English author (b. 1947)
2009 – Kim Dae-jung, South Korean lieutenant and politician, 15th President of South Korea, Nobel Prize laureate (b. 1925)
  2009   – Rose Friedman, Ukrainian-American economist and author (b. 1910)
  2009   – Robert Novak, American journalist and author (b. 1931)
2010 – Hal Connolly, American hammer thrower and coach (b. 1931)
  2010   – Benjamin Kaplan, American scholar and jurist (b. 1911)
2012 – Harrison Begay, American painter (b. 1917)
  2012   – John Kovatch, American football player (b. 1920)
  2012   – Scott McKenzie, American singer-songwriter and guitarist (b. 1939)
  2012   – Ra. Ki. Rangarajan, Indian journalist and author (b. 1927)
  2012   – Jesse Robredo, Filipino public servant and politician, 23rd Secretary of the Interior and Local Government (b. 1958)
2013 – Josephine D'Angelo, American baseball player (b. 1924)
  2013   – Jean Kahn, French lawyer and activist (b. 1929)
  2013   – Albert Murray, American author and critic (b. 1916)
2014 – Gordon Faber, American soldier and politician, 39th Mayor of Hillsboro, Oregon (b. 1930)
  2014   – Jim Jeffords, American captain, lawyer, and politician (b. 1934)
  2014   – Levente Lengyel, Hungarian chess player (b. 1933)
  2014   – Don Pardo, American radio and television announcer (b. 1918)
2015 – Khaled al-Asaad, Syrian archaeologist and author (b. 1932)
  2015   – Roger Smalley, English-Australian pianist, composer, and conductor (b. 1943)
  2015   – Suvra Mukherjee, Wife of former Indian president Pranab Mukherjee (b. 1940)
  2015   – Louis Stokes, American lawyer and politician (b. 1925)
  2015   – Bud Yorkin, American director, producer, and screenwriter (b. 1926)
2016 – Ernst Nolte, German historian (b. 1923)
2017 – Bruce Forsyth, English television presenter and entertainer (b. 1928)
  2017   – Zoe Laskari, Greek actress and beauty pageant winner (b. 1944)
2018 – Denis Edozie, Nigerian Supreme Court judge (b. 1935)
  2018   – Kofi Annan, Ghanaian diplomat and seventh Secretary-General of the United Nations (b. 1938)
2020 – Ben Cross, English stage and film actor (b. 1947)

Holidays and observances
Christian feast day:
Agapitus of Palestrina
Alberto Hurtado
Daig of Inniskeen
Evan (or Inan)
Fiacre
Florus and Laurus
Helena of Constantinople (Roman Catholic Church)
William Porcher DuBose (Episcopal Church) 
August 18 (Eastern Orthodox liturgics)
Arbor Day (Pakistan)
Armed Forces Day (North Macedonia)
Birthday of Virginia Dare (Roanoke Island)
Constitution Day (Indonesia)
Long Tan Day, also called Vietnam Veterans' Day (Australia)
National Science Day (Thailand)

References

Sources

External links

 
 
 

Days of the year
August